The Halifax Banking Company was the first bank in Nova Scotia. Established in 1825, it was unable to obtain a charter from the Nova Scotia Legislative Assembly and operated as a private company. It became incorporated as a chartered bank in 1872 and enjoyed a period of rapid growth and prosperity. The bank was merged with the Canadian Bank of Commerce in 1903.

The banking company was formed by eight prominent citizens of Halifax. They included Martin Gay Black, Henry Hezekiah Cogswell and Enos Collins. Cogswell was the first president and later Black served in this position as well.

References 

 the Halifax Banking Company

Defunct banks of Canada
Banks established in 1825
Banks disestablished in 1903
1903 disestablishments in Nova Scotia
1903 mergers and acquisitions
Canadian companies established in 1825